Reston/R.M. of Pipestone Airport  is located  northeast of Pipestone, Manitoba, Canada.

References

Registered aerodromes in Manitoba